is a former Japanese baseball player. He played infielder for the Saitama Seibu Lions and Yokohama DeNA BayStars.

External links

 NPB.com

1980 births
Hosei University alumni
Japanese baseball coaches
Japanese baseball players
Living people
Nippon Professional Baseball coaches
Nippon Professional Baseball infielders
People from Hamamatsu
Saitama Seibu Lions players
Seibu Lions players
Yokohama DeNA BayStars players